The cultural heritage of Kaliningrad Oblast is a mixture of the prewar German heritage, dating back to the prewar East Prussian period, and the Soviet and Russian designs constructed since then.

History
Many heritage sites in Kaliningrad Oblast were damaged during World War II, or willfully destroyed in the postwar period by Soviet authorities. A number of landmarks did survive, such as the gothic Königsberg Cathedral containing the tomb of Kant, or the Königsberg Stock Exchange building. Already in the 1960s, a group of local architects and intellectuals began to campaign for the preservation of the region's German heritage, albeit unsuccessfully.

The first Soviet housing blocks were built only in 1966. The spread of Soviet-style prefabricated panel buildings eventually changed the appearance of Kaliningrad. The 1970s House of Soviets is another part of the local Soviet architectural period.

Mirroring the rediscovery of pre-revolutionary history in the rest of Russia, since 1991 there have been many efforts to recover the prewar heritage sites of Kaliningrad. Preservation and reconstruction efforts are hampered by a complicated property ownership situation, as during the 1990s the city administration raised cash by selling land for construction without regard for central planning.

Old buildings are being restored, and new ones built in conscious imitation of the old Königsberg architecture. Some local architects are cautious about the reconstruction efforts, worried that the result may end up looking too kitsch and unauthentic.

Königsberg Cathedral was successfully restored from 1992 to 1998, in a joint Russian-German project. The Fischerdorf development, while being a new development, is a city quarter that intentionally mirrors the prewar architectural styles.  A project to restore Kant's House in Veselovka was announced in 2013, and should be completed in time for the 2018 World Cup.

The ruins of Königsberg Castle are being excavated, with a plan to preserve them under a transparent enclosure.

Gallery

Castles

City gates

Religious buildings

Forts

Postwar heritage

See also
 Heart of the City (Kaliningrad)
 Königsberg fortifications

References

External links
 List of cultural landmarks of Kaliningrad Oblast on WikiVoyage (in Russian)
 

Historic sites in Russia
Tourist attractions in Kaliningrad Oblast
Culture of Kaliningrad_Oblast